Tarik Isić (born 8 October 1994) is a Bosnian professional footballer who plays as a defender for Kategoria Superiore club Kukësi.

Honours
Velež Mostar
Bosnian Cup: 2021–22

References

External links

1994 births
Living people
People from Kiseljak
Association football defenders
Bosnia and Herzegovina footballers
FK Olimpik players
NK GOŠK Gabela players
FK Radnik Bijeljina players
NK Čelik Zenica players
FK Velež Mostar players
Perak F.C. players
FK Kukësi players
Premier League of Bosnia and Herzegovina players
Kategoria Superiore players
Bosnia and Herzegovina expatriate footballers
Expatriate footballers in Malaysia
Expatriate footballers in Albania
Bosnia and Herzegovina expatriate sportspeople in Albania
Bosnia and Herzegovina expatriate sportspeople in Malaysia